Na'ama Leleimalefaga (born 20 November 1987 in Palauli) is a Samoan rugby union prop. He is a member of the Samoa national rugby union team  and participated with the squad at the 2007 Rugby World Cup. He currently plays for the Worcester Warriors. He previously played for Scopa and Savaii Samoa.

References

External links
 Scrum profile
 "It's rugby" profile
 ECR profile
 Montpellier Hérault Rugby Club - Official Site

1987 births
Living people
Rugby union props
Samoan rugby union players
Samoa international rugby union players
Samoan expatriate rugby union players
Expatriate rugby union players in France
Samoan expatriate sportspeople in France